Thibron is a genus of insect in the family Tetrigidae (the groundhoppers), tribe Tetrigini, from the central part of Africa.

Species
The Orthoptera Species File lists:
 Thibron illepidus (Karsch, 1893)
 Thibron lunda (Rehn, 1930)
 Thibron mendax Rehn, 1939
 Thibron mombuttu Rehn, 1939 - synonym Pseudomitraria breviceps (Günther, 1939) - type species
 Thibron tectatus Günther, 1979

References

External links

Orthoptera genera
Caelifera
Thibron